The Israel national basketball team has completed at 29 EuroBasket competitions since their tournament debut at EuroBasket 1953 in Moscow.

Summary 

Note: Red border indicates host nation

Competitions

1953 EuroBasket
Israel competed in the EuroBasket 1953, the eighth FIBA EuroBasket, Israel's first time competing, and finished fifth.

First round - Group D

Note: Lebanon forfeited to Israel during their scheduled game.

Final round

The final round was played as an 8-team round robin, with no further playoffs.

Note: Egypt forfeited to Israel during their scheduled game.

Roster
Coach: Jacob Saltiel
 Ralph Klein
 Avraham Schneor
 Zachariah Ofri
 Daniel Levy
 Menachem Korman
 Alfred Cohen
 David Heiblum
 Simon Schmukler
 Ernst Winer
 Marcel Hefez
 Mark Mimran
 Haim Boksenbaum
 Reuven Fecher

1959 EuroBasket
Israel competed in the EuroBasket 1959, the eleventh FIBA EuroBasket, Israel's second time competing, and finished eleventh.
First round - Group C

Classification round 1

Classification round 2 - Group 1 (9th–11th Place)

1961 EuroBasket
Israel competed in the EuroBasket 1961, the twelfth FIBA EuroBasket, Israel's third time competing, and finished eleventh.
First round – Group D

Second round – Group 2

Final round

1963 EuroBasket
Israel competed in the EuroBasket 1963, the thirteenth FIBA EuroBasket, Israel's fourth time competing, and finished ninth.

First round – Group A

Knockout stage  – Places 9-12
 
 
 
 
 
 
 
 
 
 
 
 
 
 
 
 

Israel defeated Romania in their first game of the 9th-12th place classification Round. They then went on to defeat Czechoslovakia in the 9th-10th place final, to finish in ninth place.

1965 EuroBasket
Israel competed in the EuroBasket 1965, the fourteenth FIBA EuroBasket, Israel's fifth time competing, and finished sixth.

First round – Group A

Knockout stage – Places 5-8
 
 
 
 
 
 
 
 
 
 
 
 
 
 
 
 

Israel defeated against Greece in their first game in the Places 5-8 Round.  They then went on and lost to Bulgaria in the fifth place game, finishing in sixth place.

1967 EuroBasket
Israel competed in the EuroBasket 1967, the fifteenth FIBA EuroBasket, Israel's sixth time competing, and finished eighth.

First round – Group B

Knockout stage – Places 5-8
 
 
 
 
 
 
 
 
 
 
 
 
 
 
 
 

Israel lost against Finland in their first game in the Places 5-8 Round.  They then went on and lost to Italy in the seventh place game, finishing in eighth place.

1969 EuroBasket
Israel competed in the EuroBasket 1969, the sixteenth FIBA EuroBasket, Israel's seventh time competing, and finished eleventh.

First round – Group B

Knockout stage – Places 9-12
Israel lost against Greece in their first game in the Places 9-12 Round.  They then went on and defeated Sweden in the eleventh place game, finishing in eleventh place.

1971 EuroBasket
Israel competed in the EuroBasket 1971, the seventeenth FIBA EuroBasket, Israel's eighth time competing, and finished eleventh.

First round – Group B

Knockout stage – Places 9-12
Israel lost against West Germany in their first game in the Places 9-12 Round.  They then went on and defeated Turkey in the eleventh place game, finishing in eleventh place.

1973 EuroBasket 
Israel competed in the EuroBasket 1973, the eighteenth FIBA EuroBasket, Israel's ninth time competing, and finished seventh.

First round – Group A

Knockout stage – Places 5-8
Israel lost against Italy in their first game in the Places 5-8 Round.  They then went on and defeated Turkey in the seventh place game, finishing in seventh place.

1975 EuroBasket 
Israel competed in the EuroBasket 1975, the nineteenth FIBA EuroBasket, Israel's tenth time competing, and finished seventh.

First round – Group B

Knockout stage – Places 7-12
Israel went undefeated in the 7-12 knockout round, finishing in seventh place.

1977 EuroBasket 
Israel competed in the EuroBasket 1977, the twentieth FIBA EuroBasket, Israel's eleventh time competing, and finished fifth.

First round – Group A

Knockout stage – Places 5-8
Israel defeated both Belgium and Bulgaria in the Places 5-8 Round, finishing in fifth place.

1979 EuroBasket 
Israel competed in the EuroBasket 1979, the 21st FIBA EuroBasket, Israel's twelfth time competing, and finished second.

This marked Israel's first metal at the EuroBasket, with winning the silver. In addition, an Israeli competitor won the MVP award for the first time, won by Miki Berkovich.

First round – Group C

Final round
The Teams that finish their Preliminary round Groups in the 1st and 2nd places advanced to the Final Round. The first and second in this group will go to the finals.

19 June 1979
 98

 76

Roster
Coach: Ralph Klein
Mickey Berkowitz
Lou Silver
Motti Aroesti
Yehoshua "Shuki" Schwartz
Eric Menkin
Steve Kaplan
Boaz Yanai
Avigdor Moskowitz
Barry Leibowitz (c)
Pinhas Hozez

Shai Sharf

1981 EuroBasket 
Israel competed in the EuroBasket 1981, the 22nd FIBA EuroBasket, Israel's thirteenth time competing, and finished sixth.

First round – Group A

Knockout stage – Places 1-6

1983 EuroBasket 
Israel competed in the EuroBasket 1983, the 23rd FIBA EuroBasket, Israel's fourteenth time competing, and finished sixth. Israel qualified for the tournament automatically by finishing in the top eight during the EuroBasket 1981.

In addition Israeli referee David Dagan worked Group A game against Italy and Sweden as well as semi-finals game Italy vs Netherlands.

First round – Group B

Knockout stage – Places 5-8

Roster

1985 EuroBasket 
Israel competed in the EuroBasket 1985, the 24th FIBA EuroBasket, Israel's fifteenth time competing, and finished ninth. Israel qualified for the tournament automatically by finishing in the top eight during the EuroBasket 1983.

Israeli competitor Doron Jamchi lead all scorers with an average of 28.1 points per game.
Israeli referee Todd Warnick worked several games. He worked the Group A games Poland vs Romania, France vs Yugoslavia, and France vs Poland. He additionally worked the quarterfinals game Yugoslavia vs Czechoslovakia, and third place game Spain vs Italy.

First round – Group B

Knockout stage – Places 9-12

Roster

1987 EuroBasket 
Israel competed in the EuroBasket 1987, the 25th FIBA EuroBasket, Israel's sixteenth time competing, and finished eleventh. Israel qualified for the tournament during the qualification stage.

Israeli referee Todd Warnick also worked several games during the tournament. He was a referee for Group A games: Yugoslavia vs Soviet Union, Greece vs Spain, and France vs Romania. He also was a referee during the Quarterfinals game Soviet Union vs Czechoslovakia, and Semifinals game Greece vs Yugoslavia.

First round – Group B

Knockout stage – Places 9-12

Roster

1993 EuroBasket 
Israel competed in the EuroBasket 1993, the 28th FIBA EuroBasket, Israel's seventeenth time competing, and finished thirteenth. Israel qualified for the tournament after having not competed in the previous two.

Additionally, Israeli referee Reuven Virovnik worked Group B game France vs Turkey, Group D games Belgium vs Germany, and Slovenia vs Germany, and Group F games Estonia vs Turkey, Estonia vs France, and Germany vs Turkey. In addition to working Place 5-8 Round Estonia vs Spain,  and Bosnia and Herzegovina vs France. He also worked Quarterfinals games Croatia vs Bosnia, and Herzegovina and Semifinals game Greece vs Germany.

First round – Group C

Roster

1995 EuroBasket 
Israel competed in the EuroBasket 1995, the 29th FIBA EuroBasket, Israel's eighteenth time competing, and finished ninth.

Additionally, Israeli referee Reuven Virovnik worked several games during the tournament. He was the referee for the Group A game Yugoslavia vs Germany, Group B games Slovenia vs France, Finland vs Spain, Russia vs Croatia, France vs Turkey, and Slovenia vs Turkey.

First round – Group A

Tournament highs
Two Israelis finished in the top ten for assists. Guy Goodes finished fourth with an average of 3.7 per game, and Doron Sheffer finished seventh with 3.3.
Three Israelis finished in the top ten in steals. Nadav Henefeld finished first averaging 2.7 steals per game, Doron Sheffer had 2.2 and Mordechai Daniel had 1.8. Israel also finished first as a team, averaging 11.5 steals per game.
Israeli Nadav Henefeld finished third in average minutes played, with 34.2 minutes per game.

Roster

1997 EuroBasket 
Israel competed in the EuroBasket 1997, the 30th FIBA EuroBasket, Israel's nineteenth time competing, and finished ninth.
Israeli referee Reuven Virovnik also worked several games in the tournament. He was the referee for First Round Group C game Italy vs Yugoslavia, Group D games Croatia vs Germany, and Spain vs Germany. He also worked Second Round Group F games, Poland vs Croatia, and Yugoslavia vs Spain. He also worked the third place game Greece vs Russia, classification round Poland vs Lithuania, and Bosnia and Herzegovina vs Latvia.

First round – Group B

Second round – Group E

Knockout round – Place 9-12

Tournament highs
Two Israelis finished in the top ten in average points per game. Oded Kattash finished first with 22.0, and Tomer Steinhauer finished fourth with 17.1.
Tomer Steinhauer finished third in average rebounds per game with 6.4.
Oded Kattash finished ninth in average assists per game with 3.7.
Oded Kattash finished second in average steals per game with 3.6. The Israeli team also finished fifth overall for teams average steals per game, with 14.4.
Three Israelis finished in the top ten for average minutes per game, Oded Kattash finished first with 38.4, Tomer Steinhauer finished third with 34.5 and Nadav Henefeld finished fifth with 33.6.
The Israeli team finished first in average free throw percentage over the tournament, with a 76.5% average. Additionally during their game against France they had the highest free throw percentage for any team during a single game, with 90.3% after going 10 for 11.

Roster

1999 EuroBasket 
Israel competed in the EuroBasket 1999, the 31st FIBA EuroBasket, Israel's twentieth time competing, and finished ninth.

Israeli referee Reuven Virovnik also worked several games in the tournament. He was the referee for Preliminary Round Group C games Croatia vs Italy, Italy vs Bosnia and Herzegovina, and Bosnia and Herzegovina vs Croatia. In Second Round he worked Group F Turkey vs Germany, and Czech Republic vs Turkey. Additionally he worked the Quarterfinals game France vs Turkey, and Semifinals game Italy vs Yugoslavia.

Qualifier round

Preliminary round – Group A

 

Second round – Group E

 

 

Tournament highs
Doron Sheffer finish third in all players during the tournament for points per game, with 16.7.
Two Israelis finished in the top ten for average minutes per game in the tournament. Nadav Henefeld finished sixth with 33.2, and Doron Sheffer finished seventh with 32.7.
The Israeli team finished third in average assists per game, with 17.0.

Roster

2001 EuroBasket 
Israel competed in the EuroBasket 2001, the 32nd FIBA EuroBasket, Israel's 21st time competing, and finished tenth.

Israeli referee Moise Bitton also worked several games in the tournament. He was the referee for Preliminary Round, Group C, Estonia vs Germany, and Estonia vs Croatia.

Qualifier round

Preliminary round – Group A

Second round

Tournament highs
Yaniv Green finished in ninth place among all players in the tournament for average rebounds per game, with 7.0.
Yoav Saffar finished in eighth place among all players in the tournament for average steals per game, with 1.8. Lior Lubin in the game against Ukraine had more steals than anyone else in a game, with 8. Additionally the Israeli team had the highest average steals of any team, with 12.3.
Two Israelis finished in the top ten of the players in the tournament in minutes per game. Derrick Sharp finished third with 34.3 and Shalom Turgeman finished fourth with 33.9.

Roster

2003 EuroBasket 
Israel competed in the EuroBasket 2003, the 33rd FIBA EuroBasket, Israel's 22nd time competing, and finished seventh.

Israeli referee Shmuel Bachar also worked several games in the tournament. He was the referee for the Preliminary Round, Group D, Greece vs Croatia, and Turkey vs Greece. He was the referee in the fifth place games Serbia and Montenegro vs Greece. He also worked Quarterfinals game France vs Russia, and Semifinals game France vs Lithuania.

Qualifier round

Preliminary round – Group B

Second round

Quarterfinals

Knockout Stage – Place 5-8

Tournament highs
Two Israelis finish in the top ten in average assists per game. Meir Tapiro finished fourth with 3.4 and Tal Burstein finished ninth with 2.4.
Two Israelis finished in the top ten in average steals per game. Meir Tapiro finished third with 1.9 and Tal Burstein finished seventh with 1.3. Meir Tapiro also finished tied with the tournament high of five steals in a game. Israel as a team also finished fifth with average steals per game for a team, with 7.0.
Tal Burstein finished fifth in all players in the tournament in minutes per game with 31.6.
Israel during the game against Latvia had the highest 3-point field goal percentage of the tournament of 55.6% after going ten for eighteen.
Israel during the game against Spain had the highest free throw percentage of the tournament, of 100% after going six for six.

Roster

2005 EuroBasket 
Israel competed in the EuroBasket 2005, the 34th FIBA EuroBasket, Israel's 23rd time competing, and finished ninth.

Israeli referee Seffi Shemmesh also worked several games in the tournament, including Preliminary Round, Group A, games Germany vs Italy, Italy vs Russia, and Italy vs Ukraine, and fifth place game of Lithuania vs Slovenia. Additionally, referee Shmuel Bachar worked Preliminary Round, Group B, games Turkey vs Lithuania, and Bulharia vs Turkey, the third place game France vs Spain, and classification round games Russia vs Lithuania, and Slovenia vs Croatia.

Qualifying round – Group 2

Additional qualifying round – Group B

Final qualifying stage

Times given below are in Central European Summer Time (UTC+2).

Preliminary round – Group D

Knockout stage

Tournament highs
Tal Burstein and Meir Tapiro both tied for third in average number of assists per game, with 4.0. Israel also finished in first for assists for all teams in the tournament, with an average of 14.3 per game.
Dror Hajaj and Meir Tapiro both tied for second in average number of steals per game, with 3.0. Israel also finished in second for steals for all teams in the tournament, with an average of 11.8 per game.
Yaniv Green was tied for seventh place on average number of blocks per game, with 1.0.
Two Israelis finished in the top ten in average minutes per game. Tal Burstein finished fourth with 34.5, and Meir Tapiro finished tenth with 31.3.
Tal Burstein in the game against Greece, lead all players in the tournament in an individual game in turnovers, with 8.

Roster

2007 EuroBasket 
Israel competed in the EuroBasket 2007, the 35th FIBA EuroBasket, Israel's 24th time competing, and finished eleventh. Games were broadcast in Israel on Sport 5 and Channel 10.

Qualifying Round – Group 2

Additional qualifying round – Group C

Final qualifying stage

Times given below are in Central European Summer Time (UTC+2).

Preliminary round – Group A

Second round – Group E

Tournament records
Yotam Halperin finished in seventh place in average points per game, with 14.0.

Yaniv Green finished in first place in average rebounds per game, with 9.3.

Two Israelis finished in the top ten average assists per game. Meir Tapiro finished in second place with 5.0, and Yotam Halperin finished in seventh place with 2.8. Additionally Israel finished in third place a team in the tournament with an average of 13.7 assists per game.

Meir Tapiro finished in fourth place in average steals per game, with 1.5.

Yaniv Green finished in fourth place in average blocks per game, with 1.5.

Yotam Halperin finished in seventh place in average minutes per game, with 31.5.

Roster

2009 EuroBasket 
Israel competed in the EuroBasket 2009, the 36th FIBA EuroBasket, Israel's 25th time competing, and finished thirteenth. Games were broadcast in Israel on Sport 5 and Channel 1.

Referees
Several Israeli referees worked the tournament as well.

Omer Esteron worked Qualification Round, Group C, Ukraine vs Turkey, and Relegation Round, Ukraine vs Czech Republic.

Shmuel Bachar worked Qualification Round, Group A, Serbia vs Bulgaria, Group C, Turkey vs France, and Relegation Round, Ukraine vs Hungary. During the Preliminary Round he worked Group D, Poland vs Bulgaria, Bulgaria vs Turkey, and Poland vs Turkey. During the Second Round, Group F, he worked Turkey vs Spain, Slovenia vs Poland, and Poland vs Spain. During the quarterfinals he worked Turkey vs Greece.

Seffi Shemmesh worked Qualification Round, Group A, Serbia vs Italy, and Group C, Turkey vs Belgium,

Moise Bitton worked Qualification Round, Group C, Turkey vs Ukraine.

Gil Oved worked Qualification Round, Group C, Ukraine vs Belgium.

Gili Cohen worked Additional Qualifying Round, Group A, Bosnia and Herzegovina vs Portugal.

Qualifying round – Group D

 

  

 

 

First Round – Group A

 

Roster
Coach: Zvi Sherf

2011 EuroBasket 
Israel competed in the EuroBasket 2011, the 37th FIBA EuroBasket, Israel's 26th time competing, and finished thirteenth. Games were broadcast in Israel on IBA and Charlton.

Each team during the tournament consisted of 12 players. Only 1 among the 12 could be a naturalized foreign player, who could not have been in the national team of another nation. Players that traced their ancestry to the teams they represent, were allowed to play for that team. US-born David Blu, who as Jewish was entitled to Israeli citizenship from birth.

Qualifying round – Group A

Preliminary Round – Group B

Tournament highs
Israel during the tournament finished fifth in average points per game with 79.8. They also finished seventh in average assists per game with 14.8, and tenth in average steals per game, with 6.4.

Roster

2013 EuroBasket 
Israel competed in the EuroBasket 2013, the 38th FIBA EuroBasket, Israel's 27th time competing, and finished 21st. Games were broadcast in Israel on Sport 5.

Qualifying round – Group A

Preliminary Round – Group A

Roster

2015 EuroBasket 
Israel competed in the EuroBasket 2015, the 39th FIBA EuroBasket, Israel's 28th time competing, and finished tenth. Games were broadcast in Israel on Sport 5.

Qualifying round – Group B

Preliminary round – Group A

Round of 16

Tournament highs
D'or Fischer finished in third place in the tournament for average blocks per game, with 1.8.
Yogev Ohayon finished in second place in the tournament for average steals per game, with 1.7.

Roster

2017 EuroBasket 
Israel will compete in the EuroBasket 2017, the 40th FIBA EuroBasket, Israel's 29th time competing.

In addition to competing, Israel will be one of the hosts of the tournament. Following the decision to relocate the 2015 tournament, original hosts Ukraine were offered the chance to host the 2017 edition, but they declined, citing the ongoing unrest in the country. On 5 November 2015, FIBA Europe announced that five national federations have applied to organise the EuroBasket 2017: Finland, Israel, Poland, Romania and Turkey. On 11 December 2015, FIBA Europe announced that the tournament will be hosted by four countries: Israel, Romania, Finland and Turkey with the knockout stage host at the Sinan Erdem Dome in Istanbul.

First round - Group B

}

See also  
 Israel national basketball team#Past rosters

External links
Official website 
FIBA profile
Eurobasket.com

Videos
Israel v Russia - Group A - Game Highlights - EuroBasket 2015 YouTube.com video

References

EuroBasket
EuroBasket